Alne End is a village in Warwickshire, England. Population details can be found under Great Alne.

Villages in Warwickshire